Dolenji Podboršt is a small settlement in the Municipality of Mirna Peč in southeastern Slovenia. It lies on the right bank of the Temenica River south of Mirna Peč. The area is part of the historical region of Lower Carniola. The municipality is now included in the Southeast Slovenia Statistical Region. 

The local church is dedicated to Paul the Apostle and belongs to the Parish of Mirna Peč. It dates to the 16th century.

References

External links
Dolenji Podboršt on Geopedia

Populated places in the Municipality of Mirna Peč